Pál Pusztai (September 4, 1919 - September 11, 1970) was a Hungarian graphic artist and cartoonist. Pusztai is remembered for his comic strip "Jucika" (1957-1970), which gained a strong internet following in the late 2010s.

Life 
Pusztai first started working as an officer of the Hungarian State Railways, where he made public service drawings and posters. Later, he switched to advertising graphics. In 1955, he published  his first newspaper cartoons, displaying distinctive style features. Pusztai's clear, understandable and well-composed drawing style made him one of the most significant Hungarian artists of the genre. From 1959 he worked as a regular artist for the magazine Ludas Matyi. There, he authored a series of military-themed cartoon titled , featuring two characters, a Soviet and an American soldier. In keeping with the communist-sympathetic Hungary, Ivan was depicted as the wiser and more prudent of the two.

For his independent cartoon album (1963) Pál Somogyi wrote a preface. His cartoons have been published in international publications, and have been featured in international cartoon exhibitions and biennials, which have been internationally recognized. As an external collaborator he was engaged in several magazines, and his cartoons could be seen, among others, in Workers' Magazine, Country-World, Women's Magazine, Illustrated Hungary, and Füles.  He also made advertising drawings, postcards (a series of military cartoon postcards, still in circulation for many years after his death), card calendars, and designed educational and movie posters. He signed as Pusztai.

Posthumous popularity
Originally a little-known comic primarily restricted to 1960s Hungarian popular culture, Pusztai's comic Jucika gained an international cult following during the late 2010s after the series sparked renewed interest on numerous online imageboards and Twitter. The comic's online popularity inspired the establishment of a booru in November 2019 to archive fanmade images of the title character.

References

External links
 
Pál Pusztai on Lambiek
 Pál Pusztai at Budapest Poster Gallery
 

1970 deaths
1919 births
Hungarian illustrators
Hungarian cartoonists
Hungarian comics artists
Artists from Budapest